Julio González (born 7 January 1961) is a Cuban boxer. He competed at the 1992 Summer Olympics and the 1996 Summer Olympics.

References

1961 births
Living people
Cuban male boxers
Olympic boxers of Cuba
Boxers at the 1992 Summer Olympics
Boxers at the 1996 Summer Olympics
Boxers at the 1987 Pan American Games
Boxers at the 1991 Pan American Games
Boxers at the 1995 Pan American Games
Pan American Games gold medalists for Cuba
Pan American Games medalists in boxing
Competitors at the 1986 Central American and Caribbean Games
Competitors at the 1990 Central American and Caribbean Games
Central American and Caribbean Games gold medalists for Cuba
AIBA World Boxing Championships medalists
People from Cienfuegos
Lightweight boxers
Central American and Caribbean Games medalists in boxing
Medalists at the 1987 Pan American Games
Medalists at the 1991 Pan American Games
20th-century Cuban people